John Spencer Purvis Bradford SA, RAI (28 August 1918 - 12 August 1975) was an archaeologist and a pioneer in landscape archaeology and the use of aerial photography. He was born in Ealing and studied at Christ Church, Oxford University. During the Second World War he was stationed at San Severo, Italy as part of the Mediterranean Allied Photographic Reconnaissance Wing, starting in January 1943 where he analysed photographs taken by the RAF. In 1947 he was appointed University Demonstrator and Lecturer in Ethnology at the Pitt Rivers Museum. He worked in various projects in Italy, Greece and Cyprus that revolved around aerial photography and land surveys.

Publications 

 Fieldwork on aerial discoveries in Attica and Rhodes. Part I. The town plan of Classical Rhodes. (1956)
 Fieldwork on aerial discoveries in Attica and Rhodes. Part II. Ancient field systems on Mt. Hymettos, near Athens (1956)
 Ancient landscapes: studies in field archaeology. London: G. Bell and Sons (1957)

References

External links 
 Bradford Papers at the Pitt Rivers Museum

1918 births
1975 deaths
20th-century archaeologists
Alumni of Christ Church, Oxford
People associated with the Pitt Rivers Museum
Fellows of the Society of Antiquaries of London